Mark Suciu (pronounced Soo-Choo) (Born August 3, 1992) is an American professional skateboarder from Saratoga, CA, based out of New York City. In 2021, Suciu was named Thrasher's Skater of the Year.

Early life and education 
Mark Suciu was born on August 3, 1992 and grew up less than an hour south from San Francisco in Saratoga, California. Suciu has a brother and their father is from Romania. His father attended The University of California, Berkeley where he graduated with a Ph.D. in Engineering. After graduating high school, Suciu was skating full time until he sustained an ankle injury. After a period of time, Suciu felt that he was burned out from skateboarding and wanted to explore other facets of life. Suciu decided to attend Temple University where he studied Creative Writing and Literature. After two years of living in Philadelphia, Suciu moved to New York City to attend The New School.

Skateboarding career 
Suciu started skateboarding when he was six years old. He found inspiration through watching the X Games on TV, seeing local kids skating, and from his cousin who lives in Doylestown, Pennsylvania. Every summer, Suciu would visit his cousin in Pennsylvania where he was able to skate frequently in Philadelphia and Love Park. His first real skateboard was a Powell Peralta Blue & Golden Dragon Steve Caballero deck. Suciu used to compete in the eS Game of Skate contests frequently.

Video Parts 
 2005: Mijos (Getofab #6)
 2006: Future $ellout$ (Getofab #7)
 2007: Mortigi Tempo
 2009: Party Banks - Fishbanks Skateshop
 2010: Double Rock - Thrasher
 2010: Origin - Habitat
 2011: Hell on Wheels - Thrasher
 2012: Cityscape
 2012: Sabotage3
 2012: Cross Continental - Atlas/Habitat 
 2013: Philadelphia with Mark Suciu - Adidas
 2013: Search The Horizon - Habitat
 2013: The Philadelphia Experiment - Caste Quality
 2014: Good Times Are Coming - sml. Wheels
 2015: Sabotage4
 2016: Away Days - Adidas
 2017: Broadway Bullet - Adidas
 2018: Suciu ADV II part - Adidas
 2019: Verso
 2019: Connector Line - Habitat
 2021: Blue Dog - Adidas
 2021: Curve - Habitat
 2021: Spitfire - Spitfire
 2021: "Flora" Episode III - Thrasher
 2021: Ground Glass - Jenkem Magazine

Sponsors 
As of 2021, Suciu rides for Habitat Skateboards, and has numerous other sponsors including Adidas Footwear, Spitfire Wheels, Thunder Trucks, RVCA Clothing, Jessup Griptape, and Atlas Skateshop.

References 

1992 births
Living people
People from Saratoga, California
American skateboarders
Temple University alumni
Eugene Lang College alumni
American people of Romanian descent